

Events
 1452 – Leon Battista Alberti completes writing De Re Aedificatoria

Buildings and structures

Buildings

 1450
 Reconstruction of Sforza Castle in Milan as a palace begun
 Tomb of Ahi Evren in Kırşehir, Anatolia, is begun
 1451–1457 – Villa Medici in Fiesole, Tuscany, designed by Michelozzo or Leon Battista Alberti, built
 c. 1451
 Palazzo Rucellai in Florence, probably designed by Leon Battista Alberti and executed, at least in part, by Bernardo Rossellino, substantially completed
 Earliest date for start of construction of Jahaz Mahal in the Delhi Sultanate
 1452 – Hospices de Beaune in France, probably designed by Jacques Wiscrère, opened
 1456 – Ospedale Maggiore in Milan begun by Filarete.
 1457 – Edo Castle in Japan first fortified by Ōta Dōkan
 1458 – Pitti Palace in Florence begun by Bartolommeo Ammanati and perhaps Brunelleschi
 1459 – Sixty Dome Mosque (Shaṭ Gombuj Moshjid) in Khalifatabad (modern-day Bagerhat District of Bangladesh) completed
 Approximate date – Palazzo Pisani Moretta on the Grand Canal (Venice) built

Births
 1450: Bartolomeo Montagna, Italian painter and architect (died 1523)
 1452: April 15 – Leonardo da Vinci, Italian polymath (died 1519)
 c. 1456: Bramantino, born Bartolomeo Suardi, Milanese painter and architect (died c. 1530)

Deaths
 1459: c. October 25 – Khan Jahan Ali, Muslim Sufi saint, local ruler and architectural patron

References 

Architecture